Faiza Ibrahim (born March 22, 1990) is a Ghanaian international footballer. She plays as a forward.

She scored in a 3–0 win against Mali in a 2012 African Women's Championship qualification match. She scored in a 3–0 win against Ethiopia in a 2014 African Women's Championship qualification match. She was on the Ghana squad for the 2014 African Women's Championship. She was left off the Ghana squad in July 2015 due to injury. She was on the Ghana squad for the 2015 African Games.

References

External links
 

1990 births
Living people
Women's association football forwards
Ghanaian women's footballers
Police Ladies F.C. (Ghana) players
Ghana women's international footballers